Julius Henry (9 April 1586 – 20 November 1665) was duke of Saxe-Lauenburg between 1656 and 1665. Before ascending to the throne he served as Field Marshal in the imperial army.

Life

Before regency
Born at Wolfenbüttel, he was a son of Duke Francis II and his second wife Maria (1566–1626), daughter of Duke Julius of Brunswick and Lunenburg (Wolfenbüttel). Julius Henry studied at the University of Tübingen and entered into the service of King Gustavus Adolphus of Sweden afterwards. In expectation of becoming appointed Prince-Bishop of Osnabrück he converted to Roman Catholicism as a young man.

In imperial service Julius Henry commanded a regiment in the Uskok War against the Republic of Venice in 1617, later a regiment in Hungary. Julius Henry fought in the Battle of the White Mountain. As chamberlain of Emperor Ferdinands II the latter sent him as envoy to King Christian IV of Denmark and Norway. In 1619 Julius Henry, a certain Count of Altheim, and Charles Gonzaga founded the Order of the Conception, papally confirmed in 1624.

In 1623 the emperor conveyanced the lordship in Schlackenwerth (today Ostrov), which he had deprived from the Schlick family disgraced after participating in the insurgency defeated at the White Mountain, to Julius Henry. He prompted the construction of the "White Palace" (Weißes Schloss / Bílý zámek) next to the old palace of the Schlicks. Julius Henry made the White Palace his domicile.

In 1629 Julius Henry was given supreme command over the imperial troops in Poland and in this function he negotiated a peace with John George I, Elector of Saxony in 1632, after the latter had refused to join a Lutheran wart coalition under Gustavus Adolphus. Julius Henry was considered a confidant and close friend of Albrecht von Wallenstein. Thus Julius Henry was suspected to be involved in Wallenstein's assaults against the emperor. After Ferdinand had successfully instigated Wallenstein's murder the latter's friends were arrested including Julius Henry and incarcerated in Vienna.

Julius Henry successfully denied the competence of the imperial juridical commission which inquired against him, insisting on his status of immediate prince of the empire only to be judged by a college of his like. After the Peace of Prague in 1635 Ferdinand II released Julius Henry from imprisonment. After the accession of Emperor Ferdinand III in 1637 Julius Henry was again envoyed in several diplomatic missions.

Ruling Saxe-Lauenburg
In 1656 Julius Henry succeeded his elder half-brother Augustus as Duke of Saxe-Lauenburg. When ascending he confirmed the existing privileges of the nobility and the estates of the realm. In 1658 he forbade his vassals to pledge or else alienate fiefs, thus fighting the integration of manor estates in Saxe-Lauenburg into the monetary economies of the neighbouring city-states of Hamburg and Lübeck. He entered with both city-states into frontier disputes on manor estates which were in the process of evading Saxe-Lauenburgian overlordship into the competence of the city-states.

In 1659 Duke Julius Henry decreed in his general disposition (guide-lines for his government) "to also esteem the woodlands as heart and dwell [of revenues] of the Monarchy of Lower Saxony." The Duchy of Saxe-Lauenburg also used to be called simply Lower Saxony. From 1659 on Julius Henry employed Johannes Kunckel as head of the ducal pharmacy.

In 1663 Julius Henry bought the castle in Hauenstein (Bohemia) from the von Schlick family, making it part of the ducal Schlackenwerth domain. He further acquired the lordship of Ploschkowitz.

Julius Henry died of age in Prague in 1665 and was buried in Schlackenwerth.

Marriages and issue
Julius Henry married three times: He married in Grabow (1) Countess Anna of East Frisia on 7 March 1617. They had no children.

On 27 February 1628 he married in Theusing (2) Elisabeth Sophia of Brandenburg (Berlin, *13 July 1589 – 24 December 1629*, Frankfurt an der Oder), daughter of John George, Elector of Brandenburg and widow of Reichsfürst Janusz Radziwiłł. Julius Henry and Elisabeth Sophia had one son:
 Francis Erdmann of Saxony, Angria and Westphalia (Lauenburg) (Theusing, *25 February 1629 – 30 July 1666*, Schwarzenbek), duke of Saxe-Lauenburg between 1665 and 1666

Julius Henry's last wedding took place in Vienna on 18 August 1632 with (3) Anna Magdalena of Lobkowicz (*20 July 1606 – 7 September 1668*), daughter of Baron William the Younger Popel von Lobkowitz (Popel z Lobkowicz). Anna Magdalena was the only wife to officiate as Duchess of Saxe-Lauenburg, after her husband had ascended the throne on 18 January 1656. They had six children, however, only two survived infancy:
 Julius Henry (1633–1634)
 Francisca (d./b. 1634)
 Maria Benigna Francisca (Ratisbon, *10 July 1635 – 1 December 1701*, Vienna); ∞ on 4 June 1651 Ottavio Piccolomini.
 Francis William (d./b. 1639)
 Francisca Elisabeth (d./b. 1640)
 Julius Francis (Prague, *16 September 1641 – 30 September 1689*, Reichstadt), duke between 1666 and 1689

References 
 Johann Samuel Ersch and Johann Gottfried Gruber, Allgemeine Encyclopädie der Wissenschaften und Künste: in alphabetischer Folge von genannten Schriftstellern, vol. 92, Leipzig: J. F. Gleditsch, 1851, pp. 364seqq.
 Peter von Kobbe, "Julius Heinrich" in: Geschichte und Landesbeschreibung des Herzogthums Lauenburg: 3 vols., Altona: Johann Friedrich Hammerich, 1836–1837 (reprint in: Hanover-Döhren: von Hirschheydt, 1979–1984), vol. 3, pp. 56–69.

Ancestry

Notes 

|-

1586 births
1665 deaths
People from Wolfenbüttel
People from Brunswick-Lüneburg
Julius Henry
Julius Henry
Julius Henry